Dennis Wegner (born 10 January 1991) is a German footballer who most recently played as a winger for TSV Steinbach.

External links
 
 

1991 births
Living people
People from Greifswald
German footballers
Footballers from Mecklenburg-Western Pomerania
Association football midfielders
Hallescher FC players
SV Werder Bremen II players
VfL Osnabrück players
1. FC Saarbrücken players
TSV Steinbach Haiger players
3. Liga players
Regionalliga players